Mitrella aemulata is a species of sea snail, a marine gastropod mollusk in the family Columbellidae, the dove snails.

Description
The length of the shell attains 7.7 mm.

Distribution
This marine species occurs off the island of Annobón, Equatorial Guinea, West Africa.

References

 

aemulata
Endemic fauna of Annobón
Invertebrates of Equatorial Guinea
Gastropods described in 2005